Beijing Grand Bridge(北京特大桥)is a -long railway viaduct on the Beijing–Shanghai High-Speed Railway, located in Beijing. It is one of the longest bridges in the world.

References

Railway bridges in China
Bridges in Beijing
Bridges completed in 2011